Levent Ayçiçek (born 14 February 1994) is a German professional footballer who plays as an attacking midfielder for Bandırmaspor.

Club career
Ayçiçek made his Bundesliga debut on 8 February 2014 scoring Werder Bremen's only goal in a 5–1 defeat to Borussia Dortmund. He went on to make 13 appearances before the 2015–2016 season during which he only played for Werder Bremen's reserve team.

In March 2015, Ayçiçek signed a contract extension until 2018.
In January 2016, he joined 1860 Munich on loan for the remainder of the season. The loan was extended by a further season in June.

On 31 August 2017, the last day of the German summer transfer window, Ayçiçek moved to Greuther Fürth on a permanent transfer, signing a two-year contract.

Career statistics

Club

References

External links

1994 births
Living people
People from Nienburg, Lower Saxony
German people of Turkish descent
Association football midfielders
Turkish footballers
German footballers
Footballers from Lower Saxony
Germany youth international footballers
Bundesliga players
2. Bundesliga players
3. Liga players
TFF First League players
SV Werder Bremen players
SV Werder Bremen II players
TSV 1860 Munich players
SpVgg Greuther Fürth players
Adana Demirspor footballers
İstanbulspor footballers 
Bandırmaspor footballers